Jason Johnson (December 9, 1981 – May 19, 2003), also known as Camoflauge, was an American rapper, famous for his songs "Cut Friends" and "Laying My Stunt Down". He released his final album Keepin It Real in 2002.

Camoflauge was murdered in Savannah, Georgia, by gunfire outside of Pure Pain Records recording studio while he was walking his toddler son.

Influence and legacy
Johnson is the subject of a short documentary film called Camoflauge, directed by Lamia Lazrak. The film included interviews with Johnson's close family and friends including Tammie Green (his mother), Flau'Jae Johnson (his daughter), producers, and rapper Boosie Badazz. The film premiered at the 2016 Savannah Film Festival and won a 2016 Red Dot Design Award in Communication. Flau'Jae competed in Season 3 of The Rap Game. After losing to fellow rapper Nova on "The Rap Game" Flau'Jae went on to compete on another show, That being America's Got Talent in season 13, where in the final week of the Judge cuts she got the Golden Buzzer from Chris Hardwick historically becoming the first rapper in the show's history to receive this honor. She would be eliminated in the quarterfinals one week later. After that, she went on to play basketball at Louisiana State University and signed a record deal with Jay-Z's label Roc Nation.

See also
List of unsolved murders

Discography

Albums
 Crime Pays (with Crime Affiliates) (1999)
 I Represent (2000)
 Strictly 4 da Streets: Drugs Sex and Violence, Vol. 1 (2001)
 Keepin It Real (2002)

Mixtapes
 Underground Savannah (2003)
 Home of the True Emcees - Tribute to Jason "Camoflauge" Johnson (2006)
 The Camoflauge Collective (R.I.P) (2012)
 Still I Represent (2011)

Guest appearances
 Dulaa "Pure Pain" Komplex Feelings
 DJ B-Lord "Bout My Money" Trick Daddy (feat. Camoflauge)
 DJ Smallz Southern Smoke 9: Money is Still a Major Issue (Part 1 of 2) (hosted by Pitbull) "Pure Pain"
 White Dawg "We Ballin" Bonifide

See also 
 List of murdered hip hop musicians

References

External links
 Amid Moss and murder, Savannah mobilizes
 Late Rapper Camoflauge's Biography Mentions Tupac
 Camoflauge on 912RADIO.COM
 Camoflauge at IMDB
 Flau'Jae Johnson at IMDB

1981 births
2003 deaths
2003 murders in the United States
African-American rappers
Deaths by firearm in Georgia (U.S. state)
Gangsta rappers
Male murder victims
Murdered African-American people
Musicians from Savannah, Georgia
People murdered in Georgia (U.S. state)
Universal Records artists
Unsolved murders in the United States
20th-century African-American people
21st-century African-American people